The Netball World Youth Cup Gaborone 2017 was the eighth staging of the tournament previously (until 2013) known as the World Youth Netball Championships, the premier competition in  international netball, contested every four years. The 2017 tournament, to be held from 8–16 July, held in Gaborone, Botswana, which is first African region country to host the tournament. Matches are to be played at University of Botswana Indoor Stadium and Ditshupo Hall. Twenty nations competed at the championships.

Teams

Qualification
Twenty teams contested the 2017 tournament. The home nation automatically qualified, along with the next four highest-ranked teams from the 2013 World Youth Netball Championships:
  (host nation)
 
 
 
 

Qualification Tournaments
The remaining fifteen teams were determined by regional qualifying tournaments, with three teams selected from each of the five international netball regions; Africa, Americas, Asia, Europe and Oceania.

Draw
The draw for the tournament was held on 20 October 2016 at Botswana. The pools for the tournament's finals is as below:

Preliminary rounds

Pool A

Pool B

Pool C

Pool D

Playoff and placement

17th to 20th place

9th to 16th place

1st to 8th place

Bracket

Quarter-finals

Crossover

Semi-finals

7th and 8th place

5th and 6th place

Bronze medal

Gold medal

Final rankings

References

External links
NWYC2017 website

World Youth Netball Championships
World Youth Championships
Netball World Youth Cup
Netball
Netball
Netball competitions in Africa